"Copacabana", also known as "Copacabana (At the Copa)", is a song recorded by Barry Manilow. Written by Manilow, Jack Feldman, and Bruce Sussman, it was released in 1978 as the third and final single from Manilow's fifth studio album, Even Now (1978).

Background
The song was inspired by a conversation between Manilow and Sussman at the Copacabana Hotel in Rio de Janeiro, when they discussed whether there had ever been a song called "Copacabana". After returning to the US, Manilow – who, in the 1960s, had been a regular visitor to the Copacabana nightclub in New York City – suggested that Sussman and Feldman write the lyrics to a story song for him. They did so, and Manilow supplied the music.

The song's lyrics refer to the Copacabana nightclub, "the hottest spot north of Havana". The story starts in approximately 1948, focusing on Lola, a Copacabana showgirl, and her sweetheart Tony, a bartender at the club. One night, an ostentatiously wealthy man named Rico takes a fancy to Lola, but Tony intervenes when Rico becomes aggressive. The ensuing brawl ends in "blood and a single gunshot"; after it is initially unclear "who shot who[m]", Lola shrieks at the sight of Tony dead. Thirty years later, the club has been transformed into a discotheque (as the real New York Copacabana had been), but a middle-aged Lola remains in her showgirl attire, now a customer at the bar who "drinks herself half blind" lamenting the loss of her youth, her sanity and Tony.

Release and reception
"Copacabana" debuted on Billboard magazine's Top 40 chart on July 7, 1978, and peaked at number 8. It has also reached the Top 10 in Belgium, Canada, France and the Netherlands. Internationally, the song is Manilow's third-greatest hit. The track was his first gold single for a song he wrote or co-wrote. Additionally, the song earned Manilow his first and only Grammy Award for Best Male Pop Vocal Performance in February 1979.

Cash Box said that "a Latin beat, congas and added percussion, strings and horns make it unusual."

Television film and musical

In 1985, Manilow and his collaborators Bruce Sussman and Jack Feldman expanded the song into a full–length, made-for-television musical, also called Copacabana, writing many additional songs and expanding the plot suggested by the song.

This film version was then further expanded by Manilow, Feldman, and Sussman into a full-length, two-act stage musical, again titled Copacabana, which ran at the Prince of Wales Theatre on London's West End for two years prior to a lengthy tour of the UK. An American production was later mounted that toured the US for over a year. Over 200 productions of the show have since been mounted worldwide.

Charts

Weekly charts

Year-end charts

Certifications

Cover versions

 Liza Minnelli performed "Copacabana" on a 1979 episode of the American syndicated television program The Muppet Show.
James Last recorded "Copacabana" for his 1979 album Copacabana – Happy Dancing.
 Shirley Bassey released her cover of "Copacabana" on the side B of her 1979 single "This Is My Life". She also performed it on television in The Shirley Bassey Show with elaborate costumes and choreography in 1979.
 The Vandals recorded a parody of "Copacabana" called "The Dachau Cabana" in 1985.
 Amanda Lear recorded a cover of "Copacabana" in 2005 and released it as a single through Dance Street and ZYX Music. It was later included on her 2005 compilation Forever Glam!, albeit in a longer version.
 Kylie Minogue performed the song on her 2008 KylieX2008 tour.

References

1978 singles
1978 songs
2005 singles
Amanda Lear songs
Arista Records singles
Barry Manilow songs
Disco songs
Fiction set in 1948
Grammy Award for Best Male Pop Vocal Performance
Song recordings produced by Ron Dante
Songs with lyrics by Jack Feldman (songwriter)
Songs written by Barry Manilow
Songs about nightclubs
Songs about cities